Dr. Baljit Kaur is an Indian politician and an eye surgeon. She was elected to the Malout Assembly constituency, Punjab in the 2022 Punjab Legislative Assembly election as a member of the Aam Aadmi Party.

Career
She worked as an eye surgeon in the government run Muktsar civil hospital. She resigned from her job and joined AAP.

Member of Legislative Assembly
Kaur was elected as the MLA in the 2022 Punjab Legislative Assembly election.  She represented the Malout Assembly constituency in the Punjab Legislative Assembly. The Aam Aadmi Party gained a strong 79% majority in the sixteenth Punjab Legislative Assembly by winning 92 out of 117 seats in the 2022 Punjab Legislative Assembly election. MP Bhagwant Mann was sworn in as Chief Minister on 16 March 2022. She took oath as a cabinet minister along with nine other MLAs on 19 March at Guru Nanak Dev auditorium of Punjab Raj Bhavan in Chandigarh. Eight ministers including Kaur who took oath were greenhorn (first term) MLAs.

As a cabinet minister in the Mann ministry Kaur was given the charge of two departments of the Punjab Government:
 Department of Social Justice, Empowerment & Minorities
 Department of Social Security and Development of Women and Children

Electoral performance

References

Living people
Year of birth missing (living people)
Punjab, India MLAs 2022–2027
Aam Aadmi Party politicians from Punjab, India
People from Punjab, India
Mann ministry